"Don't Turn Your Back" is a song written by bass guitarist Göran Lagerberg and guitarist Anders Töpel, first recorded by their band Tages in 1965. Produced by the Violents Rune Wallebom, the song would be featured as the lead track from their debut EP Tages released three weeks later

The song was the third and final single by the group to employ a similar sound; heavily involving acoustic guitars combined with positive lyrics. Released as a single on 14 May, it was a commercial success, reaching number two on both Kvällstoppen and Tio i Topp during the summer of 1965.

Background and recording 
Throughout early 1965, Tages established themselves as successful recording artists; they had recorded two singles, "Sleep Little Girl" (1964) and "I Should Be Glad" (1965). Both of these singles were extremely commercially successful, reaching the top three on both Kvällstoppen and Tio i Topp. The former became the group's best selling single while the latter was well received in the Swedish press, unlike "Sleep Little Girl" which was flat out panned. However, "I Should Be Glad" was also slightly criticized for being "too poppy". Similarly, the group now had to face the challenges of being national stars, being chased around by girls around Gothenburg, which took its toll on the band members, who still had to keep up with school while recording.

A similar issue also faced their record label, Platina Records. Platina was at the time an entirely independent record label, whose success was based completely around Tages. Therefore, they had no distribution deal nor a recording studio, which resulted in "Sleep Little Girl" and "I Should Be Glad" being recorded in a youth centre and at the rival Metronome studio respectively. In April 1965 however, Platina signed a contract with EMI Records which lent them their studio on Sandhamnsgatan in Gärdet, Stockholm. Platina promptly booked studio time for the band in May during one of their tours. On 4 May 1965, they entered the studio with former the Violents guitarist Rune Wallebom as the producer, as he had produced "I Should Be Glad" as well. Upon finalizing their recordings on 6 May, the session resulted in four songs, "Don't Turn Your Back", "Forget Him", "Donna" and "Hound Dog".

Release 
Platina did not keep "Don't Turn Your Back" in their vaults for that long as a follow up to "I Should Be Glad" had to be released, as it had begun to drop out of the charts at the time. On 14 May 1965, Platina released "Don't Turn Your Back" as a single, backed by "Hound Dog", which was a Leiber–Stoller composition. This was the first time a cover song by the group was released, as both the A-side and B-sides of their two previous singles were original compositions. It was initially released in sleeves with both pink and orange text. Due to the success the single would get, it was eventually re-pressed in November 1965, and featured an alternate picture sleeve that featured a different photo of the band altogether.

Released in time for their summer tour, it similarly to its predecessors became a huge commercial success on both Sweden's record charts Kvällstoppen and Tio i Topp. It entered Kvällstoppen on 6 June at a position of 14, before reaching number two on 20 July, a position it held for one week. It was last seen on the chart on 14 September at a position of 16. It spent 16 weeks on the chart, seven of which were in the top-ten and three in the top-five. On Tio i Topp it was also successful, being voted in at number 11 on 29 May. It also peaked at number two on 12 June, a position it also would hold for a week. It was kept from the number one spot by "Here Comes the Night"  by Them. It was last seen on 24 July of that year at a position of 12. In total, "Don't Turn Your Back" spent nine weeks on the chart.

"Don't Turn Your Back" nor its B-side were included on any studio albums the group released during the 1960s. It was however featured as the lead track from their eponymous debut EP, released three weeks after the single on 4 June 1965, and following the group's contract with Platina expiring in 1967, also included on Hits Volym 1 in August 1967. That same month, a compilation album named The Best Of Tages was released, which included "Don't Turn Your Back" as the third track. The track's first release on compact disc was on a CD-reissue of a compilation album named Tages, 1964–1968!, released on 18 November 1992, where the song was the third track. Both sides of the single would be released on the This One's For You Box Set, released on 28 November 1964 together with all the group's other recordings.

Charts

References

Sources 

 
 

1965 singles
1965 songs
English-language Swedish songs
Tages (band) songs
Platina Records singles